Stary Susadybash (İśke Susaźıbaş) is a rural locality (a village) in Pevomaysky Selsoviet, Yanaulsky District, Bashkortostan, Russia. The population was 172 as of 2010. There are 2 streets.

Geography 
Stary Susadybash is located 20 km south of Yanaul (the district's administrative centre) by road. Andreyevka is the nearest rural locality.

References 

Rural localities in Yanaulsky District